Etta, Red-Hot & Live is the second live album by American singer Etta James and her sixteenth album overall. It was released in 1982.

Track listing

References

Etta James albums
1982 live albums
Chess Records live albums
Albums produced by Leonard Chess
Albums produced by Etta James